Vanavara may refer to:
Vanavara (rural locality), a rural locality (a selo) in Krasnoyarsk Krai, Russia
Vanavara Airport, an airport in Krasnoyarsk Krai, Russia
6404 Vanavara, a main-belt asteroid